This is a list of Catholic churches in Brazil.

Cathedrals
See: List of cathedrals in Brazil
Catedral de Nossa Senhora do Paraíso
Cathedral Basilica of St. Louis Gonzaga
Cathedral of Brasília
Cathedral of Maringá
Cathedral of Our Lady of Lourdes (Canela)
Cathedral of Salvador
Old Cathedral of Rio de Janeiro
Rio de Janeiro Cathedral
São Paulo Cathedral
Sorocaba Metropolitan Cathedral
Catedral de São Luís

Basilicas
Basílica de Nossa Senhora do Carmo (São Paulo)
Basílica José de Anchieta
Basilica of the National Shrine of Our Lady of Aparecida

Chapels
Capela de Santa Cruz (São Paulo)

Other churches
Candelária Church
Church of Nosso Senhor do Bonfim, Salvador
Church of Our Lady of Mercy
Church of Saint Francis of Assisi
Church of Saint Francis of Assisi (Ouro Preto)
Church of Saints Cosme and Damião (Igarassu)
Igreja da Ordem Terceira do Carmo (São Paulo)
Igreja de Santo Antônio (São Paulo)
Igreja de São Cristóvão (São Paulo)
Igreja do Imaculado Coração de Maria (São Paulo)
Igreja Nossa Senhora da Consolação (São Paulo)
Igreja Nossa Senhora da Glória (Sergipe)
Igreja Nossa Senhora do Brasil
Our Lady of Navigators church (Porto Alegre)
Paróquia Nossa Senhora Achiropita
Paróquia Nossa Senhora Aparecida dos Ferroviários
Paróquia Nossa Senhora de Lourdes (São Paulo)
Paróquia Nossa Senhora de Montevirgem e São Luiz Gonzaga
Paróquia Nossa Senhora do Bom Conselho
Paróquia Santa Rita de Cássia
Paróquia Santa Teresinha (São Paulo)
Paróquia Santo Ivo (São Paulo)
Paróquia São José do Belém
Paróquia São Paulo Apóstolo
Primeira Igreja Batista em Vila Silvia
Santo Antônio do Rio Abaixo Main Church
São Francisco Church and Convent

See also
List of Roman Catholic dioceses in Brazil

 
Brazil, Catholic
Brazil
Lists of religious buildings and structures in Brazil